Anke Schumann (born 21 July 1959) is a German sport shooter who competed in the 1988 Summer Olympics, in the 1996 Summer Olympics, and in the 2000 Summer Olympics.

References

1959 births
Living people
German female sport shooters
ISSF pistol shooters
Olympic shooters of East Germany
Olympic shooters of Germany
Shooters at the 1988 Summer Olympics
Shooters at the 1996 Summer Olympics
Shooters at the 2000 Summer Olympics
20th-century German women